The  Federal Ministry of Displaced Persons, Refugees and War Victims was part of the West German federal government from 1949 till 1969.

Before the formation of the Federal Republic of Germany on the territory of the three western (American, British and French) allied zones, the individual state governments were in charge of the care for displaced persons. Initially the Office for Displaced Persons was formed for the social policy task of coordinating the integration of displaced persons and refugees, caring for war victims and providing compensation and initial aid. When the new ministry was formed in September 1949 after the parliamentary elections, it took over this office.

The first minister was Hans Lukaschek, member of the Bundestag for the Christian Democratic Union (CDU) and former president of the Zentralverband vertriebener Deutscher, an organisation of displaced Germans. Before the war he was responsible for organising propaganda against the Poles in Upper Silesia. He had eight successors, until in 1969 the ministry was dissolved and its competences were distributed among other federal ministries. The ministry was target of several scandals and controversies as Lukaschek's successor Theodor Oberlander was a former active Nazi, responsible for supporting ethnic cleansing of Jews and Poles and forced to resign due to his Nazi past. Another minister Hans Kruger, also a former Nazi, was also forced to resign after his involvement in atrocities in occupied Poland was revealed. As for Lukaschek, it was speculated that his departure was the result of intrigues made by former Nazis

The ministry initially drafted the Lastenausgleichsgesetz and the Bundesvertriebenengesetz (passed in 1952 and 1953, respectively). These laws became the basis of its further activities.

The ministry also mandated a multi-volume documentation of the expulsion of Germans after World War II (Dokumentation der Vertreibung der Deutschen aus Ost-Mitteleuropa), which was prepared by a large scientific commission led by former Nazi activist Theodor Schieder. The research project took roughly ten years to complete. A crucial role in this commission was played by the Königsberger Kreis led by former Nazis Theodor Schieder and Werner Conze as well as nationalist historian Hans Rothfels; it had previously provided ideological justifications for the Third Reich's aggressive eastbound Volkstum politics.

Ministers 
Political Party:

Footnotes 

1949 establishments in West Germany
1969 disestablishments
Germany, Displaced Persons, Refugees and War Victims
Displaced Persons, Refugees and War Victims